The  20 cm/12 short naval gun was a naval gun used by the Imperial Japanese Navy to defend merchant ships and land bases during World War II.

History
Since Japan is an island nation with relatively few resources it relied upon a large merchant fleet to import the resources needed for its industry and economy.  As Japanese shipping losses mounted during the latter half of World War II the Japanese began to organize their shipping into escorted convoys and they began arming their merchant ships to defend against attacks from Allied surface combatants, submarines and carrier-based aircraft.  The 20 cm/12 short naval gun was a multi-purpose gun introduced during 1943 which combined the roles of naval gun, anti-aircraft gun, coastal defense gun, and anti-submarine gun.

Design 
The 20 cm/12 short naval gun was an autofretted monoblock gun with an interrupted screw breech that fired separate loading cased charges and projectiles.  The trunnioned gun barrel had a hydro-spring recoil mechanism above and below the barrel and was mounted on a center pivot H/A L/A gun mount.  The gun was normally mounted on merchant ships above 5,000 GRT and its large projectile would have been capable of destroying an enemy submarine making a surface attack.      

The gun also saw use on land as a coastal defense gun on hills overlooking Japanese harbors and installations or as an anti-aircraft gun.  In the anti-aircraft role, a group of four guns shared a central range and height finder for barrage fire against level bombers.  It was described as heavy and its 8° a second elevation/traverse was considered slow so its ability to track small fast moving targets such as dive bombers, torpedo bombers, and fighters was probably limited.  It is credited with being able to fire five rounds per minute but that is probably optimistic because the projectiles were heavy and the gun needed to be loaded at +10° between shots.

Ammunition 
The projectiles were propelled by a  bagged charge inside a separate loading brass or steel cartridge case.  In addition to the types listed below there may have been anti-submarine, armor-piercing, illumination, and incendiary ammunition.

Similar weapons 

12 cm/12 short naval gun - A similar Japanese anti-submarine gun which fired fixed QF ammunition.
BL 7.5-inch naval howitzer - A British anti-submarine gun used during the latter half of World War I.
 8 inch Mark 7 & Mark 8 - Two American anti-submarine guns designed late in World War I that never entered service.

Gallery

References

Bibliography

External links

Naval guns of Japan
203 mm artillery
Weapons and ammunition introduced in 1943